Spišská Belá is a town in the Kežmarok District in the Prešov Region in Spiš in northern Slovakia. Prior to World War I, it was in Szepes county in the Kingdom of Hungary.

History
The town was first mentioned in historical records in 1263. The town received town rights in 1271. Scientist and inventor Joseph Petzval was born here in 1807. The town center has been designated an historic district. The church in the center of the square was built in the 15th century. The tower next to the church was dedicated to when to town received town rights back in 1271.

Geography
The town and municipality lies at an altitude of 631 metres and covers an area of 33.94 km². It has a population of about 6,189 people.

Demographics
According to the 2001 census, the town had 6,136 inhabitants. 94.82% of inhabitants were Slovaks, 3.18% Roma, 0.31% Czechs and 0.26% Germans. The religious makeup was 85.46% Roman Catholics, 4.61% people with no religious affiliation, 3.49% Lutherans and 1.22% Greek Catholics.

Famous people
Joseph Petzval, scientist and inventor

Twin towns — sister cities

Spišská Belá is twinned with:
 Vysoké Mýto, Czech Republic
 Brück, Germany
 Ożarów, Poland
 Szczawnica, Poland

References

External links
Official website 

Cities and towns in Slovakia
Villages and municipalities in Kežmarok District
Spiš